Sarshiv District may refer to:
 Sarshiv District (Marivan County), Kurdistan Province, Iran
 Sarshiv District (Saqqez County), Kurdistan Province, Iran